Daniel V. Beiser is an American politician and former Democratic member of the Illinois House of Representatives, representing the 111th District.

He was appointed in 2004 to replace Steve Davis who resigned. Beiser has bachelor's and master's degrees from Southern Illinois University Edwardsville.

In his time as Representative, Beiser addressed significant issues facing the Metro-east, including education funding; the fight against methamphetamine and sex offenders; and the protection of Social Security. Beiser has also taken a leading role in the fight to provide financial relief for local residents in light of increased electric rates and sponsored a non-partisan conceal carry bill.

On August 30, 2017, Beiser announced his retirement from the Illinois House of Representatives, making him the 15th legislator in 2017 to do so. He then resigned on December 17, 2017. Monica Bristow was appointed to succeed Beiser as state representative.

On August 28, 2019, Governor J.B. Prizker appointed Beiser to serve as a member of the Illinois Racing Board. On April 23, 2020, Pritzker designated Beiser to be the Chair of the Board. On January 10, 2021, Pritzker nominated Beiser for a term ending July 1, 2026. He was not confirmed during the 101st General Assembly and his appointment was carried over to the 102nd General Assembly for consideration.

References

External links
Biography, bills, and committees at the 100th Illinois General Assembly
By session: 99th, 98th, 97th, 96th, 95th, 94th, 93rd
Dan Beiser for State Representative
 
Daniel V. Beiser at Illinois House Democrats

Democratic Party members of the Illinois House of Representatives
Living people
Southern Illinois University Edwardsville alumni
Year of birth missing (living people)
People from Alton, Illinois
21st-century American politicians